Thomas Lister (1688 – 15 May 1745), of Gisburne Park, Yorkshire, was a British landowner and Tory politician who represented Clitheroe in the House of Commons from 1713 to 1745.

Early life
Lister was baptized on 18 October 1688, the eldest son of Thomas Lister of Arnoldsbigging and Westby, Yorkshire and his wife Elizabeth Parker, daughter of John Parker of Extwisle, Lancashire. He was educated at Eton College from 1698 to 1706 and matriculated at Balliol College, Oxford on 1 February 1706, aged 17, although he claimed to have learnt very little in two and a half years there. He succeeded his father in 1706. In 1709 he was admitted at Middle Temple. He married Catherine Assheton, (died 1728), daughter of Sir Ralph Assheton, 2nd Baronet of Middleton and Whalley, Lancashire on  27 November 1716.

Career
Lister's family held an electoral interest at Clitheroe, having owned property there since the 14th century. When he stood at a by-election on 23 April 1713, he was described as a ‘very puisne young gentleman’, as well as being ‘honest’. After being returned as Member of Parliament for Clitheroe in 1713, he made little impact in Parliament. He was classed as a Tory but in spite of Tory leanings, he voted on 18 June 1713 against the French commerce bill. 

At the 1715 general election, Lister was elected MP for Clitheroe again in a contest. He improved his local interest  by his marriage in 1716, and after he was elected in a contest at the 1722 general election he was able to turn this into control of one seat. He consistently voted against the Government, and spoke on 7 May 1728 against a vote of credit.

He moved the family seat from Arnoldsbigging to Lower Hall in Gisburn, which his father had acquired from Sir John Assheton in 1697. He rebuilt Lower Hall as Gisburne Park between 1726 and 1736. The hall is of two storeys on an H-shaped floor plane, with nine bays on the south front, the central three being recessed, pebbledashed with sandstone dressings and with a hipped slate roof.

The park was also developed and designs were produced by Robert, 8th Lord Petre. Lister was returned unopposed on his own interest at the general elections of 1727, 1734 and 1741.

Death and legacy
Lister died on 15 May 1745 and was buried at Gisburn on 22 May 1745. He had two sons and three daughters, one of whom predeceased him.  Both his sons, Thomas and Nathaniel Lister, sat for Clitheroe, as did his grandson Thomas, who was raised to the peerage as Baron Ribblesdale.

References

1688 births
1745 deaths
People educated at Eton College
Alumni of Balliol College, Oxford
Members of the Parliament of Great Britain for English constituencies
British MPs 1713–1715
British MPs 1715–1722
British MPs 1722–1727
British MPs 1727–1734
British MPs 1734–1741
British MPs 1741–1747